Jennie Gomarlo is a New Hampshire politician.

Education
Gomarlo graduated from Monadnock Regional High School. Later, Gomarlo earned a BS in industrial chemistry from Keene State College.

Career
Gomarlo has been the owner and bookkeeper of Gomarlo's Inc. since 1990. On November 6, 2018, Gomarlo was elected to the New Hampshire House of Representatives where she represents the Cheshire 12 district. She assumed office on December 5, 2018. She is a Democrat.

Personal life
Gomarlo resides in Swanzey, New Hampshire. Gomarlo is married to Michael and has two children.

References

Living people
Keene State College alumni
People from Cheshire County, New Hampshire
Women state legislators in New Hampshire
Democratic Party members of the New Hampshire House of Representatives
21st-century American politicians
21st-century American women politicians
Year of birth missing (living people)